Kuwait Economic Society – KESOC – (Arabic: الجمعية الاقتصادية الكويتية) is a public-benefit organization that has been established in 1970 in Kuwait. The organization is managed by an elected board to provide integrated support and consultation to governmental and non-governmental institutions in the fields of economics as well as to participate and organize field-related competitions local events.

References 

Organizations based in Kuwait City
Organizations established in 1970
Arab organizations